() is a Portuguese dish categorized according to mode of preparation as an . The name means "meat marinated with garlic and wine".
 Originating in Madeira and the Azores islands, it is typically made with cloves, thyme, paprika, red pepper paste and wine or vinegar as well as garlic. It is traditionally served at Christmas time in Madeira.

 was taken by people from the Portuguese islands of Madeira and the Azores to the Americas where it is known as "pickled pork" or "vinyoo dalyge". It is also known as "garlic pork" in Trinidad and Tobago (and "calvinadage" there) and Guyana where it was introduced in the early 19th century.

In Goa, the dish is called , closer to its Portuguese counterpart, and is likewise usually made with pork. Over time it was adapted to local tastes, with different meat choices, the addition of Indian spices and the substitution of malt vinegar or coconut palm vinegar for wine as well as the copious use of chili peppers, which were themselves introduced by Portuguese traders in the 16th century. Spices favored by Goan cooks include tamarind, cinnamon, black pepper, and cardamom as well as a variety of sugar similar to panela known as jaggery. The traditional Goa version lacks potatoes, but because Portuguese  was misheard as "aloo", the Hindi word for potato, many Indian versions of vindaloo include them.

References

Azorean culture
Christmas food
Foods with alcoholic drinks
Guyanese cuisine
Madeiran cuisine
Pork dishes
Portuguese cuisine
Trinidad and Tobago cuisine